Lost & Found is the second studio album by ambient duo Jónsi & Alex, released digitally on 11 October 2019. The album was a surprise release to accompany the beginning of their North American tour celebrating the 10th anniversary release of Riceboy Sleeps. This is the final album before Jónsi and Alex's split less than a month after the album's release.

Music

The album's music sounds similar to the music in its predecessor, Riceboy Sleeps, and includes many of the same samples. The songs "Boy" and "Stokkseyrar-Disa" seem to be reworkings of the tracks from "Boy 1904" and "Stokkseyri" from Riceboy Sleeps, with similar modulation and harmonic structure, but the overall direction of the tracks differs from the songs they are based on. Regarding the album, the band said,

Track listing
"Hundslappadrifa" – 6:10
"Boy" – 7:51
"Stokkseyrar-Disa" – 18:10
"Sleeping Summer" – 11:29
"In The Sea (Drowned)" – 11:15
"Wind in Our Ears" – 9:25

References 

2019 albums
Jónsi albums